Bronshtein and Semendyayev (often just Bronshtein or Bronstein, sometimes BS) is the informal name of a comprehensive handbook of fundamental working knowledge of mathematics and table of formulas originally compiled by the Russian mathematician Ilya Nikolaevich Bronshtein and engineer Konstantin Adolfovic Semendyayev.

The work was first published in 1945 in Russia and soon became a "standard" and frequently used guide for scientists, engineers, and technical university students. Over the decades, high popularity and a string of translations, extensions, re-translations and major revisions by various editors led to a complex international publishing history centered around the significantly expanded German version. Legal hurdles following the fall of the Iron Curtain caused the development to split into several independent branches maintained by different publishers and editors to the effect that there are now two considerably different publications associated with the original title – and both of them are available in several languages.

With some slight variations, the English version of the book was originally named A Guide-Book to Mathematics, but changed its name to Handbook of Mathematics. This name is still maintained up to the present by one of the branches. The other line is meanwhile named Users' Guide to Mathematics to help avoid confusion.

Overview 
Bronshtein and Semendyayev is a comprehensive handbook of fundamental working knowledge of mathematics and table of formulas based on the Russian book  (literally: "Handbook of mathematics for engineers and students of technical universities") compiled by the Russian mathematician Ilya Nikolaevich Bronshtein and engineer Konstantin Adolfovic Semendyayev.

The scope is the concise discussion of all major fields of applied mathematics by definitions, tables and examples with a focus on practicability and with limited formal rigour. The work also contains a comprehensive list of analytically solvable integrals, that is, those integrals which can be described in closed form with antiderivatives.

History 

With Dmitrii Abramovich Raikov, Bronshtein authored a Russian handbook on elementary mathematics, mechanics and physics, which was published in 1943.

Around the same time in 1939/1940, Bronshtein, together with Semendyayev, also wrote their Russian handbook of mathematics for engineers and students of technical universities. Among other sources this work was influenced by the 1936 Russian translation of the 1931 edition of the much older German .
Hot lead typesetting had already started when the Siege of Leningrad prohibited further development and the print matrices were relocated. After the war, they were considered lost, but could be found again years later, so that the first edition of  could finally be published in 1945.

The expanded German translation  (literally: "Pocketbook of mathematics") by Viktor Ziegler was first published in 1958 by B. G. Teubner in Leipzig. It was honoured as "" ("Most beautiful book") of the year 1958.

Based on the German translation, an English translation became available as well under the title A Guide-Book to Mathematics in 1964, first by Pergamon Press and The Macmillan Company, later by Springer Verlag and Verlag Harri Deutsch.

In 1966, it became apparent that the title needed considerable updates to meet new requirements. The original authors felt too old to continue the work and the Russian publisher Nauka seemed to have had lost interest in the further development as well for some while. Therefore, in 1970, a consortium of East-German mathematicians were contracted by Teubner Verlag to start to expand and revise the work. This was coordinated by Viktor Ziegler, Dorothea Ziegler and Günter Grosche (University of Leipzig). While Semendyayev contributed some work, he did not want some other new chapters to be included in the manuscript in 1976, therefore they had to be split out into a new volume II. Finally, after almost a decade of work, the major new revision could be published in 1979, legally as a cooperation of Teubner and Nauka.

The reworked two-volume German edition was well received and again became a "standard" in higher mathematics education in Germany. This led to a string of high-volume revisions and translations into Russian, English and Japanese to meet the international demand. The English version was published by Van Nostrand Reinhold Company and Verlag Harri Deutsch as Handbook of Mathematics.

A decade later, the German '' and the later reunification led to considerable changes in the publishing environment in Germany between 1989 and 1991. The East-German publisher Teubner Leipzig was integrated into the West-German publisher Teubner Stuttgart. These changes put an end to the cooperation of the East-German Teubner Verlag with the West-German Verlag Harri Deutsch, who had been licensing this and other titles for distribution in Germany and Switzerland, a business model no longer working in a free market. Licensing issues caused the development to split into two independent branches by the two publishing houses:

This was first published in 1992/1993. When Verlag Harri Deutsch closed its business two decades later, Europa-Lehrmittel took over in 2013. They continue to maintain this work up to the present (2020). The new English translation (now by Springer Verlag) is still called Handbook of Mathematics.

This was first published in 1995/1996 – still as a two-volume work. When Vieweg+Teubner was bought by Springer and renamed Springer Vieweg Verlag, several new chapters were added and some more advanced contents stripped out for the single-volume  (literally: "Springer pocketbook of mathematics") in 2012/2013. This is now accompanied by a completely reworked and considerably expanded four-volume series named  (literally: "Springer handbook of mathematics") by Zeidler also based on the former Bronshtein and Semendyayev. So far, this latest revision of the alternative development branch isn't available in English, but volume I of the former  has been translated and published by Oxford University Press as Oxford Users' Guide to Mathematics already.

Editions

1945–1978: Bronshtein and Semendyayev editions

Russian editions (1945–1977, 1998–2009) 
Authors: Bronshtein, Ilya Nikolaevich; Semendyayev, Konstantin Adolfovic.

 Nauka Moscow  :
 1st edition, 1945 (556 pages, print run of 50 000):
 2nd edition, 1948 (556 pages, print run of 83 000 units):
 3rd revised edition, 1953 (chapter IV by  rewritten and chapters 8–10 added):
 4th edition, 1954: (Gostekhizdat)
 5th edition, 1955
 6th edition, 1956 (ii+608 pages):
 7th edition, 1957 (609 pages)
 8th edition, 1959
 9th edition, 1962,  (Fizmatgiz / ).
 10th edition, 1964 (614 pages):  (reprint 2013, paperback, Book on Demand Ltd.)
 11th edition, 1967 (608 pages + 1 inlet, last Russian edition of this series, as Nauka published in a print run of 100 000 units a translation of Mathematical Handbook for Scientists and Engineers by Granino and Theresa M. Korn instead in 1968)
 1977 (end of production?)

 Nauka (Наука) / Fizmatlit (Физматлит) 
 15th edition, 1998 (608 pages, reprint of 11th edition 1967): 
 Lan  :
 reprint edition (print run: 2000), 2009 (608 pages):  (paperback)
 reprint edition, 2010-04-21 (608 pages):

German editions (1958–1978) 
Authors: Bronshtein, Ilya Nikolaevich; Semendyayev, Konstantin Adolfovic; Miller, Maximilian.
Translator: Ziegler, Viktor.

 BSB B. G. Teubner Verlagsgesellschaft :
 1st expanded edition, 1958 (xii+548 pages + 1 inlet sheet, based on 4th or 6th Russian edition, ca. 1954, with a chapter by Miller added)
 2nd edition, 1959 (xii+548 pages + 1 inlet sheet):
 3rd further expanded edition, 1960 (xiii+584 pages + 1 inlet sheet, with another chapter by Miller added):
 1st edition, 1961 (xiii+584 pages + 1 inlet sheet):
 2nd edition, 1961 (xiii+584 pages + 1 inlet sheet):
 2nd edition, 1962 (xiii+584 pages + 1 inlet sheet):
 3rd edition, 1962 (xiii+584 pages):
 4th edition, 1964 (xiii+584 pages):
 ? edition, 1965 (xiii+584 pages + 1 inlet sheet):
 5th edition, 1965 (xiii+584 pages + 1 inlet sheet):
 6th unchanged edition, 1st printing, 1963 (xiii+584 pages): (soft plastic cover)
 6th edition, 2nd printing, 1965 (xiii+584 pages): (soft plastic cover)
 6th edition, 1966 (xiii+585 pages + 1 inlet sheet): (soft plastic cover)
 6th edition, 1966 (xiii+584 pages + 1 inlet sheet):
 7th reviewed and corrected edition, 1967 (xiii+585 pages + 1 inlet sheet):
 8th edition, 1967 (xiii+585 pages + 1 inlet sheet): (soft plastic cover)
 8th unchanged edition, 1967 (xiii+585 pages): (soft plastic cover)
 8th edition, 1968 [1967] (xiii+585 pages + 1 inlet sheet):
 9th edition, 1969 (xiii+585 pages + 1 inlet sheet):
 10th edition, 1969 (xiii+585 pages + 1 inlet sheet): (soft plastic cover)
 10th edition, 1969 (xiii+585 pages + 1 inlet sheet): (soft plastic cover)
 10th edition, 1970 (xiii+585 pages + 1 inlet sheet):
 11th edition, 1971 (xiii+585 pages + 2 inlet sheets):
 12th edition, 1973 (xiii+585 pages + 1 inlet sheet)
 12th edition, 1973 (xiii+585 pages + 2 inlet sheets):
 13th edition, 1973 (xiii+585 pages + 2 inlet sheets): 
 14th edition, 1974
 15th edition, 1975 (xiii+585 pages + 2 inlet sheets)
 15th edition, 1975 (xiii+585 pages + 2 inlet sheets): 
 16th edition, 1976 (xiii+585 pages + 2 inlet sheets)
 16th edition, 1976 (xiii+585 pages + 2 inlet sheets): 
 17th edition, 1977 (xiii+585 pages + 2 inlet sheets):
 17th edition, 1977 (xiii+585 pages + 2 inlet sheets): 
 18th edition, 1978 (xiii+585 pages)

Polish editions (1959–2019) 

 
 1959 (696 pages)
  (PWN), Warsaw: 
 1968
 1973
 1986
 1996
 1997
 2004
  PWN, Warsaw: 
 2010
 2017 (856 pages): 
 2019 (856 pages)

Hungarian editions (1963–1987) 

Translator: György, Bizám

 Műszaki Könyvkiadó, Budapest: 
 extended 2nd edition, 1963 (768 pages)
 3rd edition, 1974 (768 pages): 
 4th edition, 1980 (768 pages): , 
 5th edition, 1982 (768 pages): 
 6th edition, 1987 (1190 pages):

French editions (1963–1990) 

Translator: Lefort, Henri

 , Paris: 
 1st edition, based on 8th Russian edition (935 pages + inlet ""), 1963
 2nd edition, 1967
 1976
 9th edition, 1990 (935 pages)

Slovenian editions (1963–1994) 

Translator: 

 , Ljubljana /  :
 1st edition, 1st printing, 1963 (2+699 pages+corrigenda): 
 1st reprint, 1967 (699 pages+corrigenda): 
 2nd reprint, 1970 (700 pages+corrigenda): 
 3rd reprint, 1972 (700 pages+corrigenda): 
 , Ljubljana :
 4th reprint, 1975 (pre+699 pages+corrigenda): 
 5th reprint, 1978 (2+699 pages): 
 6th reprint, 1980 (2+699 pages): 
 7th reprint
 8th reprint, 1984 (pre+699 pages): 
 9th reprint, 1987 (pre+699 pages): 
 10th reprint, 1988 (pre+699 pages): ,  (book)
 , Ljubljana /  :
 11th reprint, 1990 (2+699 pages): ,  (book)
 12th reprint, 1992 (2+699 pages):,  (book)
 13th reprint, 1994 (2+699 pages): ,  (book)

Serbo-Croatian editions (1964–1975) 
Editor: Blanuša, Danilo.
Translators: Vistrička, Zvonko; Uremović, Ivan

 , Zagreb :
 1st edition, 1964 (695 pages, based on 9th Russian edition, 1962)
 1975 (696 pages)

English editions (1964–1973, 2013) 
Translators: Jaworowski, Jan W.; Bleicher, Michael N.

 Pergamon Press, Oxford / The Macmillan Company, New York A Guide-Book to Mathematics for Technologists and Engineers:
 1st edition, 1964 (783 pages, based on German edition):  (book)

 1971 (783 pages + 2 page inlet)
 Verlag Harri Deutsch / Springer Verlag New York, Inc. A Guide Book to Mathematics:
 1st edition, 1971 (783 pages + 1 inlet sheet, based on enlarged German edition):  (book)
 Verlag Harri Deutsch / Springer Verlag New York, Inc. A Guide Book to Mathematics: Formulas, Tables, Graphs, Methods:

Spanish editions (1971–1988, 2001–2004) 
Editor: Aparicio Bernardo, Emiliano.
Translator: Harding Rojas, Inés.
 Cultura popular, Mexico 
 1st edition, 1971 (696 pages) 
 Editorial MIR, Moscow  (based on Russian edition, 1973):
 2nd edition (694 pages)
 1988 (695 pages): 
 2004 (4th reprint by Rubiños-1860) of 1988 edition (696 pages):  (paperback)
 Rubiños-1860, S.A., Madrid / Editorial MIR, Moscow :
 1993 (696 pages): 
 Quinto Sol :
 2001:  (reprint)

1979–1991: Grosche and Ziegler editions

German editions (1979–1991) 

Editors: Grosche, Günter; Ziegler, Viktor; Ziegler, Dorothea.
Authors: ; Belger, Martin; Benker, Hans; Denkmann, Norbert; Deweß, Monika; Erfurth, Horst; Gentemann, Helmut; Göthner, Peter; Gottwald, Siegfried; Grosche, Günter; Hilbig, Harald; Hofmann, Reinhard; ; ; ; Semendjajew, Konstantin Adolfowitsch; Vettermann, Theodor; Wünsch, Volkmar; Zeidler, Eberhard.

 BSB B. G. Teubner Verlagsgesellschaft / Verlag Harri Deutsch  (yearly print run of 10 000 for Teubner and Harri Deutsch each):
 19th completely revised edition, 1979 [December 1978] (xi+860 pages, based on 18th German edition, 1978):  (soft plastic cover)
 20th edition, 1981 (ix+840 pages):  (soft plastic cover)
 21st edition, 1983 [April 1982] (ix+840 pages):  (soft plastic cover)
 22nd edition, 1985 (ix+840 pages):  (soft plastic cover)
 23rd edition, 1987 (xii+840 pages):  /  (soft plastic cover)
 24th edition, 1989 (xii+840 pages):  (soft plastic cover)
 25th edition, 1991 (xii+824 pages):  (soft plastic cover)

Editors: Grosche, Günter; Ziegler, Viktor; Ziegler, Dorothea.
Authors: Bär, Gunter; Deweß, Günter; Deweß, Monika; ; Göhde, Dietrich; Jentsch, Lothar; Miller, Maximilian; Piehler, Joachim; Zeidler, Eberhard.

 BSB B. G. Teubner Verlagsgesellschaft / Verlag Harri Deutsch :
 1st edition, 1980 [1979] (v+218 pages): 
 2nd edition, 1981 (v+218 pages): 
 3rd edition, 1984 (v+218 pages): 
 4th edition, 1986 (vi+218 pages):  / 
 5th edition, 1988 (v+234 pages): 
 6th edition, 1990 (vi+234 pages):

Russian editions (1980–1986) 
Editors: Grosche, Günter; Ziegler, Viktor; Ziegler, Dorothea.
 Nauka / Tec-Theor-Lit :
 12th completely revised edition, 1980 (retranslation from 19th German edition)
 12th edition, 1981 (718 pages, retranslation from 19th German edition, 1979)
 Nauka, Moscow / GFML  :
 13th corrected edition, 1986 (544 pages, two-color print, 250 000 units):  (book)
 13th edition, 1986 (544 pages)

English editions (1985, 1998) 
Editor: .
Translator: Hirsch, Kurt August

 Verlag Harri Deutsch / Van Nostrand Reinhold Company Handbook of Mathematics:

 3rd completely revised edition, 1985 (xv+973 pages, based on 19th/20th German edition, licensed from Edition Leipzig):  (soft plastic cover)
 3rd completely revised edition, 1985 (xv+973 pages, based on 19th/20th German edition, licensed from Edition Leipzig):  (soft plastic cover)
 Springer Handbook of Mathematics:
 reprint of 3rd edition, 1997/1998 (978 pages):  (book)
 reprint of 3rd edition, 1998 (xxx+973 pages): ,  (ebook)

Japanese editions (1985–1987) 

Translators: Miyamoto, Toshio; Matsuda, Nobuyuki.

 Morikita Publications, Tokyo  (literally: "Handbook of mathematics"):
 November 1985 (1226 pages, based on German edition):  (paperback)
 Morikita Publications, Tokyo  (literally: "Basic handbook of mathematics"):
 1986 (721 pages):  (hardcover)
 1987 (685 pages): ISBN ? (hardcover)

1995–2013: Zeidler editions

German editions (1995–2013) 
Editor (part I): Zeidler, Eberhard.
Authors (part I): Hackbusch, Wolfgang; Schwarz, Hans Rudolf; Zeidler, Eberhard.

Editors (part II): Grosche, Günter; Ziegler, Viktor; Ziegler, Dorothea; Zeidler, Eberhard.
Authors (part II): ; Deweß, Günter; Deweß, Monika; Diekert, Volker; Fuchssteiner, Benno; Gottwald, Siegfried; Gündel, Susanne; Hoschek, Josef; Olderog, Ernst-Rüdiger; Richter, Michael M.; Schenke, Michael; Widmayer, Peter; Zeidler, Eberhard.

 Teubner, Stuttgart :
 part I, 1st edition, 1996 [1995] (xxvi+1298 pages, based on 25th German edition, 1990):  (soft plastic cover)
 part II, 7th completely reworked and extended edition, 1st printing, 1995 (xvi+830 pages, based on 6th German edition, 1990):  (soft plastic cover);  (ebook)
 part II, 7th edition, 2nd printing, 1996 [1995] (xvi+830 pages):  (soft plastic cover)
 Vieweg+Teubner Verlag :
 part I, 2nd reviewed edition, 2003 (xxv+1298 pages):  (book);  (ebook)
 part II, 8th reviewed edition, 1st printing, 2003 (xvi+830 pages):  (book);  (ebook)
 part II, 8th reviewed edition, 2nd printing, 2012 [2003] (xvi+830 pages):  (book);  (softcover / paperback)

Editors: Zeidler, Eberhard.
Authors: Hackbusch, Wolfgang; Hromkovič, Juraj; ; Schwarz, Hans Rudolf; Blath, Jochen; Schied, Alexander; Dempe, Stephan; ; Gottwald, Siegfried; Zeidler, Eberhard.

 Springer Spektrum, Vieweg+Teubner Verlag (Springer Fachmedien Wiesbaden) / Springer Vieweg :
 3rd reworked and extended edition, 2013 [2012] (xx+1310 pages):  (softcover);  (ebook with additional content)

Editors: Zeidler, Eberhard.
Authors: Hackbusch, Wolfgang; Hromkovič, Juraj; ; Schwarz, Hans Rudolf; Blath, Jochen; Schied, Alexander; Dempe, Stephan; ; Gottwald, Siegfried; Zeidler, Eberhard.

 Springer Spektrum, Springer Fachmedien Wiesbaden :
 part I, 1st edition, 2013 [Summer 2012] (xii+635 pages):  (hardcover);  (ebook)
 part II, 1st edition, 2013 [Summer 2012] (xi+329 pages):  (hardcover);  (ebook)
 part III, 1st edition, 2013 [Summer 2012] (xiii+529 pages):  (hardcover);  (ebook)
 part IV, 1st edition, 2013 [Summer 2012] (xvii+622 pages):  (hardcover);  (ebook)

English editions (2004–2013) 
Editor: Zeidler, Eberhard.
Authors: Hackbusch, Wolfgang; Schwarz, Hans Rudolf; Zeidler, Eberhard.
Translator: Hunt, Bruce.

 Oxford University Press Oxford Users' Guide to Mathematics:
 2004 (xxii+1284 pages, based on German , part I, 2003):  (soft plastic cover)
 2013:  (book)

Chinese edition (2012) 
Editor: Zeidler, Eberhard
Translator: Li Wenlin
 1st edition, 2012 (1303? pages): , [https://www.wenjiangs.com/wp-content/uploads/pdf/mathematical-guide.zip]

1992–2020: Musiol and Mühlig editions

German editions (1992–2020) 
Editors: ; Mühlig, Heiner.
Authors: Baumann, Ulrike; Brunner, Jürgen; ; Fleischer, Norbert Mozesovich; Grauel, Adolf; Reif, Roland; Reitmann, Volker; Steinert, I.; Marsolek, Lothar; ; Mühlig, Heiner; Nickel, Heinz; Weber, Matthias; .

 Verlag Harri Deutsch :
 1st edition, 1993 [1992] (xxvi+848 pages, based on the Russian 1967 or 1977 revision):  (book) (white/blue soft plastic cover)
 2nd edition, 1995:  (book) (white/blue soft plastic cover)
 3rd edition, 1997/1998:  (book) (white/blue soft plastic cover)
 4th edition, 1999 (1151 pages):  (book);  (book with CD-ROM) (soft plastic cover)
 5th edition, 2000 (1234 pages):  (book);  (book with CD-ROM) (white/red/black soft plastic cover)
 6th edition, 2005 (ca. 1242 pages):  (book);  (book with CD-ROM) (white/red/black soft plastic cover)

Editors: ; Mühlig, Heiner.
Authors: Baumann, Ulrike; Bernstein, Swanhild; Brand, Joachim; Brunner, Jürgen; Buchleitner, Andreas (CD-ROM only); ; Fleischer, Norbert Mozesovich; Grauel, Adolf; Reif, Roland; Reitmann, Volker; Rumpf, Benno (CD-ROM only); Steinert, I.; Tiersch, Markus (CD-ROM only); Marsolek, Lothar; Mulansky, Bernd; ; Mühlig, Heiner; Nickel, Heinz; Weber, Matthias; Wellens, Thomas (CD-ROM only); .

 Verlag Harri Deutsch :
 7th edition, 2008 (1268 pages):  (book);  (book with CD-ROM) (white/red/black soft plastic cover)
 8th edition, 2012 (1235 pages):  (book);  (book with CD-ROM) (white/red/black soft plastic cover)
 Europa-Lehrmittel (Edition Harri Deutsch) :
 9th corrected edition, 2013 (1280? pages, based on 8th German edition by Verlag Harri Deutsch, 2012, incorporating corrections after 5th English edition by Springer):  (book);  (book with CD-ROM) (white/red/black soft plastic cover)
 10th edition, 2016 (xli+1233 pages):  (book);  (book with CD-ROM) (white/red/black soft plastic cover)
 11th edition, 2020-07-28 (ca. 1280 pages):  (soft plastic cover);  (HTML download)

Slovenian editions (1997–2020) 
Contributors: Barbič, Janez; Dolinar, Gregor; Jurčič-Zlobec, Borut; Mramor Kosta, Neža.
Translator: Barbič, Janez.

 , Ljubljana :
 2nd reworked edition, 1997 (xxvii+967 pages, based on German edition): , 
 1st reprint of 2nd reworked edition, 1997 (xxvii+967 pages): ,  (soft plastic cover)
 1st corrected reprint of 2nd reworked edition, 2009 (xxvii+967 pages): , 
 2nd corrected reprint of 2nd reworked edition, 2012 (xxvii+967 pages): , 
 3rd corrected edition (xxvii+967 pages):

Hungarian editions (2000–2009) 

 Typotex, Budapest:  (based on German edition by Verlag Harri Deutsch, 1999)
 1st edition, 2000 (1188 pages): 
 8th edition, 2002 (1210 pages): 
 8th corrected and revised edition, 2006 (1209 pages): 
 9th edition, 2009 (1209 pages):

English editions (2002–2015) 
Editors: ;Mühlig, Heiner.
Authors: Baumann, Ulrike; Brunner, Jürgen; ; Fleischer, Norbert Mozesovich; Grauel, Adolf; Reif, Roland; Reitmann, Volker; Steinert, I.; Marsolek, Lothar; ; Mühlig, Heiner; Nickel, Heinz; Weber, Matthias; .
Translator: Szép, Gabriella.

 Springer Verlag, Heidelberg Handbook of Mathematics:
 4th edition, 2002 (1000? pages, based on 5th German edition, 2000):  (book)
 4th edition, 2004 (lxxxiv+1158 pages, based on 5th German edition, 2000): ,  (ebook)

Editors: ; Mühlig, Heiner.
Authors: Baumann, Ulrike; Bernstein, Swanhild; Brand, Joachim; Brunner, Jürgen; Buchleitner, Andreas (CD-ROM only); ; Fleischer, Norbert Mozesovich; Grauel, Adolf; Reif, Roland; Reitmann, Volker; Rumpf, Benno (CD-ROM only); Steinert, I.; Tiersch, Markus (CD-ROM only); Tóth, János; Marsolek, Lothar; Mulansky, Bernd; ; Mühlig, Heiner; Nickel, Heinz; Weber, Matthias; Wellens, Thomas (CD-ROM only); .

 Springer Verlag, Heidelberg Handbook of Mathematics:

Croatian edition (2004) 

Translator: Uremović, Ivan

 Golden marketing,  :
 4th edition, 2004 (xliv+1168 pages, based on the 5th German edition, 2000):

Serbian edition (2004) 

Translators: Šućur, Miljenko; Valčić Trkulja, Milena.

 Soho Graph, Belgrade :
 1st edition, 2004 (xxxviii+1191 pages, based on the 5th German edition, 2000):

Polish editions (2007–2020) 

  PWN, Warsaw: 
 2007 (1258 or 1260 pages)
 2013 (1259 pages): 
 2015
 2020

Chinese edition (2020) 
Editors: Bronstein, Semendyayev, Musiol, Mühlig
Translators: Li Wenlin et al.
 , Beijing:  -  [Mathematics Handbook] (based on the 10th German edition of )
 1st edition, 2020-12 (1547? pages):

Bronshtein-integrability 
Due to Bronshtein and Semendyayev containing a comprehensive table of analytically solvable integrals, integrals are sometimes referred to as being "Bronshtein-integrable" in German universities if they can be looked up in the book (in playful analogy to terms like Riemann-integrability and Lebesgue-integrability).

See also 
 Hütte
 Korn (KK)
 Abramowitz and Stegun (AS)
 Gradshteyn and Ryzhik (GR)

Notes

References

External links 
  (Web site of Europa-Lehrmittel)

1945 non-fiction books
20th-century Russian literature
20th-century German literature
21st-century German literature
Handbooks and manuals
Mathematics books
Mathematical tables